Dreams of King Sejong: Yeo Min Lak (2CD) is TeRra Han's court kayageum full version series No.2. Young San Hue Sang|Yeo Min Lak (여민락: 與民樂) is a Korean court instrumental music of the Choseon dynasty of Korea. Yeo Min Lak means 'pleasure with people' , this song originally had lyrics from yongbi eucheonga in forms of chamber or large orchestra music, but after a long period, the piece is now performed only instrumentally. TeRra Han plays Yeo Min Lak for only solo kayageum.

Track listing

CD1

CD2

Personnel
Han Terra – Kayageum

References

Han Terra albums
2015 albums